Pie hole may refer to:

 "Pie Hole", a song from Terry Scott Taylor's 2000 album Avocado Faultline
 The Pie Hole, a fictional bakery in the television series Pushing Daisies
 A slang and sometimes offensive term for the human mouth
 Pi-hole, a network level advertisement and tracking blocker